Roscoe station is a station on the G Line of the Los Angeles Metro Busway system located in Canoga Park in the western San Fernando Valley, it opened in June 2012. It is part of the Los Angeles Metro Busway system. The station is currently in service as part of the Metro Orange Line Chatsworth Extension. The station has bicycle lockers. A parking lot was not planned for this station.

The station is located at the intersection of Canoga Avenue and Roscoe Boulevard. The station features similar station amenities like the existing Orange Line Stations. Additionally, station art is added to the station.

Service

Station Layout

Hours and frequency

Connections 
, the following connections are available:
 Los Angeles Metro Bus:

References

External links 

G Line (Los Angeles Metro)
Los Angeles Metro Busway stations
Canoga Park, Los Angeles
Public transportation in the San Fernando Valley
Public transportation in Los Angeles
Bus stations in Los Angeles
2012 establishments in California